Pterocerdale insolita is a species of freshwater dartfish known only from Weipa, Queensland, Australia.  This species grows to a length of  SL.  This species is the only known member of its genus.

References

Microdesmidae
Gobiidae
Fish described in 2009
Monotypic fish genera